Fasslia is a monotypic moth genus in the family Erebidae. Its only species, Fasslia hampsoni, is found in Colombia. Both the genus and the species were first described by Paul Dognin in 1911.

References

Phaegopterina
Monotypic moth genera
Moths of South America